Günther Heydemann (11 January 1914 – 2 January 1986) was a German U-boat commander in the Kriegsmarine of Nazi Germany in World War II. He was a recipient of the Knight's Cross of the Iron Cross.

World War II
On U-575s third war patrol which was part of the second wave of Operation Drumbeat, also referred to as the Second Happy Time, Heydemann was given a special task and did not sink any ships.

Summary of career

Awards
Wehrmacht Long Service Award 4th Class (1 April 1937)
Iron Cross (1939)
 2nd Class (17 September 1939)
 1st Class (12 April 1941)
U-boat War Badge (1939) (12 April 1941)
Knight's Cross of the Iron Cross on 3 July 1943 Kapitänleutnant and commander of U-575

References

Citations

Bibliography

 
 
 
 
 
 

1914 births
1986 deaths
U-boat commanders (Kriegsmarine)
Recipients of the Knight's Cross of the Iron Cross
Reichsmarine personnel
People from Greifswald
Military personnel from Mecklenburg-Western Pomerania